is a Japanese voice actress currently affiliated with HiBiKi Cast. She has voiced characters in the anime series Bermuda Triangle: Colorful Pastrale, Rebirth, and BanG Dream!, where she is also a member of the band Morfonica, serving as the vocalist and portraying the in-universe character Mashiro Kurata.

Career
Shindō signed a contract with HiBiKi agency at the age of 14. In 2019, she made her voice acting debut in the Bermuda Triangle: Colorful Pastrale anime series where she voiced Caro. She also portrayed Shūko Mino in the Rebirth short anime series, part of Bushiroad's Rebirth for you card game.

In March 2020, Bushiroad announced the formation of Morfonica, a live-action band for its BanG Dream! franchise, with Shindō handling vocals and portraying in-universe character Mashiro Kurata. She was already familiar with the series prior to Morfonica, having regularly played the mobile game BanG Dream! Girls Band Party!. At 15 years of age, she was the youngest voice actress in the franchise and the same age as Mashiro at her introduction; series creator Takaaki Kidani felt the shared age emphasizes the connection between Shindō and her character, including their real-life and in-universe growths, respectively. 

In an interview with Famitsu magazine, Shindō noted that she has a low voice in contrast to Mashiro's intended pitch, so she tries to perform Morfonica songs in a higher tone. In the wake of backlash and cyberbullying from parts of the fan base for her singing voice and the addition of Morfonica to Girls Band Party! before fellow band Raise A Suilen, Bushiroad and her agency have stated their intention to take legal action.

She is also involved in Bushiroad's D4DJ franchise as a member of the DJ unit Lyrical Lily, for which she voices the character Haruna Kasuga.

Personal life
Shindō was born in the Aichi Prefecture on April 20, 2004.

Discography

 2020: Cosmic CoaSTAR (with Lyrical Lily)

Voice acting roles

Anime
 2019: Bermuda Triangle: Colorful Pastrale as Caro
 2020: Rebirth as Shūko Mino
 2020–present: BanG Dream! as Mashiro Kurata
 2020: BanG Dream! Girls Band Party! Pico: Ohmori
 2021: BanG Dream! Film Live 2nd Stage
 2021: BanG Dream! Girls Band Party! Pico Fever!
 2022: BanG Dream! Poppin'Dream!
 2022: BanG Dream! Morfonication
 2020: Assault Lily Bouquet as Akari Tamba
 2021: D4DJ Petit Mix as Haruna Kasuga
 2022: Life with an Ordinary Guy Who Reincarnated into a Total Fantasy Knockout as Ultina
 2022: Cardfight!! Vanguard will+Dress as Megumi Ōkura
 2023: D4DJ All Mix as Haruna Kasuga

Video games
 BanG Dream! Girls Band Party! as Mashiro Kurata
 D4DJ Groovy Mix as Haruna Kasuga
 Quiz RPG: The World of Mystic Wiz as Enigma Clover
 Magia Record (2020) as Mikage Yakumo
 Azur Lane (2023) as HMS Hero (H99).

References

External links
 
 Profile at HiBiKi (Japanese)
 Profile at Anime News Network

2004 births
21st-century Japanese singers
21st-century Japanese women singers
Japanese voice actresses
Living people